Helden der Kreisklasse is a German television series.

See also
List of German television series

External links
 

2004 German television series debuts
2006 German television series endings
German-language television shows
German sports television series
Television shows set in Dortmund